The Analogue Nt mini (stylized with a lowercase "m") is a video game console designed and manufactured by Analogue, Inc. It was designed to play games for the Nintendo Entertainment System and the Famicom, like the original Analogue Nt. Unlike the former, the Nt Mini uses an FPGA for processing.

History
The Analogue Nt mini was announced in August of 2016.

The system cost $449.99 at launch, with the first consoles being shipped on January 23, 2017.

The final production run of both the Analogue Nt mini and the Analogue Nt mini Noir Edition occurred in 2020. Delays in shipping this edition lead this console to notably experience a significant increase in price in the European Union due to a larger trade dispute later in 2020.

Hardware
The Nt mini uses an Altera Cyclone V FPGA processor. Kevin Horton was a lead developer in programming the FPGA.

The Nt mini features a 1080p HDMI, analog video (RGB, Component, S-Video, & Composite), analog audio (48kHz 16-bit), original NES-style controller ports, a Famicom expansion port, and a Famicom microphone input. Like its predecessor, the Nt mini's enclosure is made of an aluminum alloy uni-body enclosure manufactured from 6061 aluminum.

Game selection occurs via cartridge or by an SD card slot. New firmware can also be loaded using the SD card slot.

References

Unlicensed Nintendo Entertainment System hardware clones
Products introduced in 2017
Home video game consoles
Analogue (company) products
Discontinued video game consoles
FPGA-based video game consoles